The American Bison Society (ABS) was founded in 1905 to help save the bison from extinction and raise public awareness about the species by pioneering conservationists and sportsmen including Ernest Harold Baynes (the Society's first secretary), William T. Hornaday and Theodore Roosevelt.

Over 40 million American bison (Bison bison) once roamed the plains and grasslands from Mexico to central Canada, shaping the landscape with their migrations, grazing patterns, and behavior. By the 1870s, their populations had been decimated by westward expansion and over-hunting. An 1889 survey published by Hornaday, who would go on to become the first director of the Bronx Zoo, showed that approximately 1,000 bison remained in North America.

History

The American Bison Society was formed to prevent the extinction of the American bison.  In 1907, the ABS shipped 15 bison from the Bronx Zoo to the Wichita Mountains Wildlife Refuge and Game Preserve in Oklahoma by cart and rail. This was the first animal reintroduction in North America. In 1908, following successful petitioning by ABS, the US Congress passed a bill to establish a permanent National Bison Range in Montana, provided that ABS raise the $10,000 needed to purchase the animals for the herd.  They exceeded this fundraising goal, and in 1909, these animals were released on the new national range. In 1913, the New York Zoological Society (now the Wildlife Conservation Society), working with ABS, donated 14 bison to Wind Cave National Park in South Dakota,  and ABS assisted in founding the herd at Fort Niobrara National Wildlife Refuge in Nebraska. Because of the secure populations of bison in these public herds, the ABS considered their work done, and the organization was disbanded in 1935.

In 2005, the American Bison Society was re-launched by the Wildlife Conservation Society (WCS) to secure the ecological future of bison in North America.

On August 12, 2010 National Geographic published a progress report on the Wood Bison Recovery Program at Alaska Wildlife Conservation Center that is supported in part by WCS - North America.

See also

 American bison (Bison bison)
 Bison hunting
 Bison
 Buffalo Commons
 Conservation of American bison
 European bison
 Great bison belt
 Steppe Bison
 Wisent
 Wood bison
 Yellowstone Park Bison Herd

References

External links 
 American Bison Society
 WCS Institute’s ABS Web pages
 Wildlife Conservation Society website
 American Bison Society collection finding aid, Wildlife Conservation Society Archives

Animal conservation organizations
Bison
Wildlife conservation organizations
Ecology organizations
Nature conservation organizations based in the United States
Environmental organizations based in the United States
Great Plains
Fauna of the Great Plains
Environmental organizations established in 1905
Organizations disestablished in 1935
1905 establishments in the United States
1935 disestablishments in the United States
Environmental organizations established in 2005
2005 establishments in the United States
Wildlife Conservation Society